Steven Bernard Sheppard (born March 21, 1954) is a retired American basketball player from New York City, who was nicknamed "Bear".

A 6'6" forward from the University of Maryland, Sheppard participated on the United States national basketball team which won a gold medal at the 1976 Summer Olympics.  Sheppard was then selected by the Chicago Bulls as the eighth pick in the second round of the 1977 NBA Draft.  In two NBA seasons (1977–1979) with the Bulls and Detroit Pistons, Sheppard scored 367 points and grabbed 178 rebounds.

References
Career statistics at basketball-reference.com
sports-reference

1954 births
Living people
African-American basketball players
American expatriate basketball people in Italy
American men's basketball players
Basketball players at the 1976 Summer Olympics
Basketball players from New York City
Chicago Bulls draft picks
Chicago Bulls players
Detroit Pistons players
DeWitt Clinton High School alumni
Maryland Terrapins men's basketball players
Medalists at the 1976 Summer Olympics
Olympic gold medalists for the United States in basketball
Pallacanestro Virtus Roma players
Small forwards
21st-century African-American people
20th-century African-American sportspeople